Trichosalpinx orbicularis is a species of orchid found from Trinidad to Central America and southern tropical America.

References

External links 

orbicularis
Orchids of Central America
Orchids of Trinidad